Daniel MacDonald or McDonald may refer to:

 Daniel J. MacDonald (1918–1980), Canadian politician
 Daniel McDonald (Nova Scotia politician) (1817–1911), lawyer and political figure in Nova Scotia
 Daniel Macdonald (missionary) (1846–1927), missionary and linguist
 Daniel McDonald (actor) (1960–2007), American actor
 Daniel C. MacDonald (1882–?), politician in Prince Edward Island, Canada
 Daniel D. McDonald (1865–?), politician in Manitoba, Canada
 Daniel MacDonald (wrestler) (1908–1979), Canadian Olympic wrestler

See also
 Dan R. MacDonald (1911–1976), composer of fiddle tunes